Artem Kholod (born 22 January 2000) is a Ukrainian professional footballer who plays as a midfielder for El Paso Locomotive.

Career
Born in Kharkiv, Kholod began his career in the local FC Metalist youth sportive schools, with his first trainer Yevhen Nazarov, until his transfer to the FC Shakhtar youth sportive system in 2016.

He played in the Ukrainian Premier League Reserves and never made his debut for the senior Shakhtar Donetsk's squad. In August 2020 Kholod signed one-year loan contract with the Ukrainian First League FC Metalist 1925 Kharkiv and made the debut for this team as a start squad player in a drawing home match against FC Nyva Vinnytsia on 5 September 2020.

On 8 August 2022, El Paso Locomotive announced the signing of Kholod from Shakhtar Donetsk for the 2022 USL Championship season.

References

External links
 
 

2000 births
Living people
Footballers from Kharkiv
Ukrainian footballers
Ukrainian expatriate footballers
FC Shakhtar Donetsk players
FC Metalist 1925 Kharkiv players
FC Mariupol players
El Paso Locomotive FC players
Association football midfielders
Ukrainian Premier League players
Ukrainian First League players
USL Championship players
Expatriate soccer players in the United States
Ukrainian expatriate sportspeople in the United States
Ukraine youth international footballers